Stephen Douglas Burton (born February 24, 1943) is an American composer.

Life and career
A native of Whittier, California, Burton received his musical education at the Oberlin Conservatory, where he studied from 1960 to 1962, and Peabody Conservatory, from which he received his master's degree in 1974; he studied further at the Salzburg Mozarteum under Hans Werner Henze. From 1970 until 1974 he was on the faculty of the Catholic University of America; beginning in 1973 he taught at George Mason University, from which he retired in 2006. There he became a professor in 1983; he was named the Heritage Chair in Music in 1996. Burton has received commissions from such groups as the Berlin Philharmonic, the Chicago Symphony Orchestra, and the Orchestre National de France. Active as well in the field of film music, he worked with Gillian Anderson to restore the original scores for the 1922 version of Robin Hood, the 1925 version of Ben-Hur, The Passion of Joan of Arc and the 1923 version of The Ten Commandments; the last-named score was used when the film reopened Grauman's Egyptian Theater in 1998. As an orchestrator, Burton assisted in the preparation of Gian-Carlo Menotti's Goya before its 1987 premiere. His textbook Orchestration, published in 1982, is popularly used in the teaching of the discipline.

Burton received a Guggenheim Fellowship in 1969. During his career he has received five grants from the National Endowment for the Arts, as well as grants from the National Opera Institute; the American Society of Composers, Authors, and Publishers; the Myers Foundation; the Kipplinger Foundation; the Dreyfus Foundation; and the Coolidge Foundation.

Works
Adapted from:

Stage
No Trifling with Love (opera, one act, libretto by the composer after Alfred de Musset), 1970

Finisterre (ballet), 1970
An American Triptych (three one-act operas, librettos by the composer), 1975
Maggie (after Stephen Crane)
Dr. Heidegger's Experiment (after Nathaniel Hawthorne)
Benito Cereno (after Herman Melville)
The Duchess of Malfi (opera, three acts, libretto by Christopher Keene after John Webster), 1975–1978

Symphonies
Symphony no. 1, for orchestra, 1968
Symphony no. 2, Ariel, for mezzo-soprano, baritone, and orchestra, on texts by Sylvia Plath, 1976
Symphony no. 3, Songs of the Tulpehocken for tenor and orchestra, on Pennsylvania German folk texts, 1976
Symphony no. 4, Homage to Bach for organ and orchestra, 1980
Symphony no. 5, Prelude, for orchestra, 1981
Symphony no. 6, "I Have a Dream", for soprano, narrator, chorus, and orchestra, on text by the composer after Martin Luther King Jr., 1987
Symphony no. 7, The Tempest, for orchestra, 1988

Other
Ode to a Nightingale for soprano and orchestra, to a text by John Keats, 1962
Stravinskiana, concerto for flute and orchestra, 1971

Dithyramb for orchestra, 1972
String Quartet, 1973
Impressione Romani for piano, percussion, and tape, 1974
Six songs to texts by Hermann Hesse for soprano and chamber ensemble, 1974
6 Hebrew Melodies for mezzo-soprano and piano on texts by Lord Byron, 1975
Eurydice for violin and chamber ensemble, 1977
Fanfare for Peace for orchestra, 1983
Consecration for fourteen brass and eight timpani, 1996

References

1943 births
Living people
American male classical composers
American classical composers
20th-century American composers
20th-century American male musicians
21st-century American composers
21st-century American male musicians
Oberlin Conservatory of Music alumni
Peabody Institute alumni
Mozarteum University Salzburg alumni
Catholic University of America faculty
George Mason University faculty
People from Whittier, California
Classical musicians from California